Thomas Anthony Thacher (January 11, 1815 – April 7, 1886) was an American classicist and college administrator.

Early life
Thomas A. Thacher was born in Hartford, Connecticut, the son of Anne (née Parks) and Peter Thacher. His first American ancestor on his father's side was Thomas Thacher who emigrated from England to Massachusetts in 1635, and later became minister of the Old South Church in Boston; on his mother's side he was descended from the Rev. Thomas Buckingham of Saybrook, one of the founders of the Collegiate School of Connecticut, since known as Yale College. He had his preparatory training at the Hopkins Grammar School, Hartford, and graduated from Yale with the class of 1835; where he was a member of Skull and Bones.

Career
For a short time he held a temporary teaching position in New Canaan, Connecticut, and then went to a school in Georgia, which was later to become Oglethorpe University. In all he spent three years teaching in two academies in Georgia, returning to Yale College on Dec. 1, 1838, to take the position of tutor. He was appointed assistant professor of Latin and Greek in 1842 and one year later the title was restricted to Latin and he was given a year's leave of absence for study in Europe. This year was eventually extended to two years and from 1843 to 1845 he studied in Germany and Italy. While in Berlin he instructed the Crown Prince of Prussia, and his cousin, Prince Frederick Charles. Six years after his return to Yale he was made professor of Latin. He was long a trustee of Hopkins Grammar School in New Haven and was a member of the state board of education 1866-77. He was on the committee for building the Yale Art School, serving with President Noah Porter and Professor Daniel Coit Gilman.

Thacher was identified with Yale College more closely than any of his contemporaries. President Timothy Dwight V said of him, "His influence with the Faculty and the Corporation equaled or even surpassed that of any other College officer." This extraordinary position was due not primarily to his scholarship, although he had the reputation of being a sound and thorough scholar, but to his keen interest and constant activity in the management of college affairs both faculty and undergraduate. Before the day of deans, Thacher did much of the work which a dean would perform today. He was known as one of the best disciplinarians that the college ever had and yet he retained the devotion and affection of undergraduates to an extraordinary degree. As an undergraduate he had been "exuberant in spirit," and one who was a student under him in Yale writes of "Tutor Thacher, the florid and fiery, of perpetual youth and enthusiasm."

He and Professor Theodore Dwight Woolsey were the first advocates at Yale of graduate instruction in non-technical fields and he himself was one of the first classicists to go abroad for the advancement of his scholarship. This scholarship was never very productive. He edited Cicero's De Officiis in 1850, and largely as a result of his work with Karl Zumpt in Berlin he published in 1871 A Latin Grammar for the Use of Schools, a translation of the work of Johan Nikolai Madvig. Aside from these productions, a few slight essays and book reviews in the New Englander make up his professional output. A teacher always, rather than an investigator, he seems even to have had a slightly suspicious attitude toward those who gave too much time to research.

Even in his teaching he was possibly too much of a disciplinarian and was sometimes thought to stick too rigorously to the grammar. To his work as administrator, Thacher brought exceptional qualifications and in this line lay his great achievements. As a teacher he contributed his share to the department's prestige while, with his strong convictions and fearless courage, his energy in raising and administering funds, his interest in people, his wide acquaintance with Yale alumni, and his devout and conscientious character, he played a larger role in the building of modern Yale than that of any one of his contemporaries. -- Clarence W. Mendell

Family
On Sept. 16, 1846, he married Olivia Day, better known as Livy, the daughter of President Jeremiah Day of Yale. She died on May 18, 1858, leaving five sons, and on Aug. 1, 1860, he married her cousin Elizabeth Baldwin Sherman, who with three sons and one daughter survived him. Both wives were granddaughters of founding father Roger Sherman.

His son Thomas Thacher was a prominent lawyer. His sons Sherman Day Thacher and William Larned Thacher were the founders of the Thacher School in Ojai, California; and his daughter Elizabeth Sherman Thacher married William Kent. He was also the paternal grandfather of US Solicitor General Thomas D. Thacher and Molly Kazan, and the great-great-grandfather of actress and writer Zoe Kazan.

See also
List of Skull and Bones Members

References

Sources
 "Thomas Anthony Thacher." Dictionary of American Biography Base Set. American Council of Learned Societies, 1928-1936. Reproduced in Biography Resource Center. Farmington Hills, Mich.: Thomson Gale. 2005. http://galenet.galegroup.com/servlet/BioRC

Further reading
D. W. Allen, Geneal. and Biog. Sketches of the Descendants of Thomas and Anthony Thacher (1872)
T. T. Sherman, Sherman Geneal. (1920)
Obit. Record, Grads. of Yale Coll., 1886; Biog. and Hist. Record of the Class of 1835 in Yale Coll. (1881)
W. L. Kingsley, Yale Coll.: A Sketch of Its Hist. (1879)
Timothy Dwight, Memories of Yale Life and Men (1903)
J. L. Chamberlain, Universities and Their Sons, Yale Univ. (1900)
Noah Porter, in New Englander and Yale Review, May 1886
New Haven Evening Register, Apr. 7, 1886
files in the secretary's office, Yale Univ.

External links
 
Thomas Anthony Thacher Papers (MS 1697). Manuscripts and Archives, Yale University Library.

1815 births
1886 deaths
Yale College alumni
Hopkins School alumni
Oglethorpe University alumni
Yale University faculty
American people of English descent